Evandro Russo Ramos (born 22 July 1985), known as just Evandro, is a Brazilian footballer.

His given name also misspelled as Ivandro.

Biography
Evandro started his career at Italy, then played for Swiss side Seefeld Zürich and Cyprus.

Evandro joined Al-Nejmeh on 6 February 2007. In December 2007 he signed a -year contract with Mogi Mirim of Campeonato Paulista Série A2, which he left for another São Paulo side Red Bull Brasil in June 2008. After played for Mogi Mirim at 2009 Campeonato Paulista, in March 2009 he signed a contract until the end of Campeonato Paulista Série A2 with Linense. In August 2009 he left for Poços de Caldas for 2009 Taça Minas Gerais and 2010 Campeonato Mineiro Módulo II.

In July 2010 he was signed by Uberaba. He played 7 games at 2010 Campeonato Brasileiro Série D.

In December 2010 he was signed by Tupi after passed the trail.

References

External links 
 

1985 births
Living people
Sportspeople from Campinas
Brazilian footballers
APEP FC players
Nejmeh SC players
Ayia Napa FC players
Mogi Mirim Esporte Clube players
Clube Atlético Linense players
Uberaba Sport Club players
Tupi Football Club players
Brasiliense Futebol Clube players
Cypriot First Division players
Association football forwards
Brazilian expatriate footballers
Expatriate footballers in Italy
Expatriate footballers in Switzerland
Expatriate footballers in Lebanon
Expatriate footballers in Cyprus
Brazilian expatriate sportspeople in Cyprus
Brazilian expatriate sportspeople in Lebanon
Lebanese Premier League players